Epicedia is a genus of longhorn beetles of the subfamily Lamiinae, containing the following species:

 Epicedia maculatrix (Perty, 1831)
 Epicedia trimaculata (Chevrolat, 1856)
 Epicedia wrayi Waterhouse, 1887

References

Lamiini